Möckel is a German surname. Notable people with the surname include:

Christian Möckel (born 1973), German footballer
Gotthilf Ludwig Möckel (1838–1915), German architect
Helmut Möckel (disambiguation), multiple people
Ingrun Helgard Moeckel (1941–1977), German model
Jens Möckel (born 1988), German footballer
Karl Möckel (1901–1948), German Nazi SS officer at Auschwitz concentration camp executed for war crimes

German-language surnames
Surnames from nicknames